This article shows the qualification phase for the 2021–22 CEV Champions League. 17 teams will play in the qualification round. The two remaining teams will join the other 18 teams automatically qualified to the League round based on the European Cups' Ranking List. All 15 eliminated teams will compete in the 2021–22 CEV Cup.

Participating teams
The Drawing of Lots took place on 25 June 2021 in Luxembourg City.

Preliminary round
All times are local

|}

First leg

|}

Second leg

|}

First round
All times are local

|}

First leg

|}

Second leg

|}

Second round
All times are local

|}

First leg

|}

Second leg

|}

Third round
All times are local

|}

First leg

|}

Second leg

|}

References

External links
 Official website

Qualification
CEV Champions League qualification